The Bermuda First Division is the second level of professional football in Bermuda.

The competition had nine participants in the 2019/2020 season.

Due to the COVID-19 pandemic, as happened in the first division, the last round of the competition was cancelled. The 0–0 score was recorded in all games in the round.

The title of champion of the 2019–20 season was shared between the Devonshire Colts F.C. and Saint George's Colts F.C. teams, who finished the competition with the same score and goal difference. The two teams also gained access to the Bermudian Premier Division.

Current Teams

2019–20 Season

 Clube Vasco da Gama Bermuda
 Devonshire Colts F.C.
 Flanagan's Onions F.C.
 Hamilton Parish F.C.
 Ireland Rangers FC
 Saint David's Warriors FC
 Saint George's Colts F.C.
 Wolves Sports Club 
 YMSC Bluebirds FC

Source:

References

External links
Bermuda Football Association
Bermuda – List of Champions, RSSSF.com

Second level football leagues in the Caribbean
1